Lake Mary Road is a north–south road in the U.S. state of Arizona, traversing for  through Coconino County from State Route  87 (SR 87) east of Clint's Well to its northern terminus in Flagstaff. The section outside of Flagstaff is designated Coconino County Road 3 (CR 3).

Route description

Lake Mary Road begins as CR 3. Its southern terminus is at an intersection with SR 87 in southern Coconino County, north of the Mogollon Rim. From there, Lake Mary Road (CR 3) heads north-northwest, traveling for  before reaching the tiny community of Happy Jack. After that, the road curves north heading towards Mormon Lake, the largest natural lake in Arizona. During the winter months, the stretch of Lake Mary Road east of Mormon Lake is closed, and travelers using the road must take Mormon Lake Road around the west side of the lake before getting back onto Lake Mary Road. Upon reaching Flagstaff city limits, CR 3 ends and Lake Mary Road continues. The road reaches its northern end at Beulah Boulevard in Flagstaff, at the southwest corner of the Interstate 17/Interstate 40 (I-17/I-40) interchange.

Lake Mary Road, sometimes referred to as Forest Highway 3, is known for its recreational opportunities, as it runs through pine forest areas and past three northern Arizona lakes. It is also renowned for its gently rolling hills and wide roadway shoulders, making bicycling along the road attractive. The road has also become a destination for recreational runners, because the road has wide shoulders and easy access to trailheads and parking spots.

Major intersections

References

External links

USFS map of Lake Mary Road (2013)

Transportation in Coconino County, Arizona
Streets in Arizona
Flagstaff, Arizona